The Old Rivalry, also known as Male-Manual or Manual-Male, is an annual football game between Louisville Male High School and duPont Manual High School in Louisville, Kentucky. It is one of the oldest high school football rivalries in the United States. Male currently leads the rivalry in total wins.  It is the oldest high school football rivalry in the state of Kentucky. The Rivalry is taken extremely seriously by both schools, as both of them consider the game to be one of the biggest events of the school year. The winner of the game is given the Barrel to display at their school. The current holder of the barrel is LMHS.

References 

High school football in Kentucky
Recurring sporting events established in 1893
Sports competitions in Louisville, Kentucky
1893 establishments in Kentucky
Jefferson County Public Schools (Kentucky)